There are a number of Basque breeds and cultivars. These are domesticated animals that have been bred - or plant species cultivated - for particular traits and features by Basque people in the Basque Country.

Some, such as the Alano Español, are not originally Basque but have only survived in the Basque Country.

Basque livestock breeds

Azpi Gorri
The Azpi Gorri is a breed of goat found in the Gorbeia region between Álava and Biscay, the Encartaciones, Anboto and Aramotz in Biscay. With less than 100 animals, it is considered an endangered rare breed. The Azpi Gorri is the only recognised goat breed from the region

Basco-béarnaise

The Basco-béarnaise is a sheep breed from the Northern Basque Country and Béarn. Its characteristics are long, white wool, curved horns, weighing up to 80 kg. It is mainly a dairy sheep and the milk (7.42% fat content, 5.39% proteins) is used to make the AOC Ossau-Iraty cheese. The equivalent breed in the Spanish Basque Country is the Vasca Carranzana.

Basque Mountain Horse

Baztanesa 

The Baztanesa or Baztango Txerria is an extinct breed of Basque pig of Celtic type. It originated in – and is named for – the Baztan Valley in northern Navarre, and until the 1960s was the most common pig in that area.

Betizu
The Betizu is a cattle breed characterised as being agile, with a large head and a rectangular profile.

Burguete horse

Chato Vitoriano
The Chato Vitoriano, also called the Chato de Vitoria, Chato Alavés or Chato de Llanada among other names, is an extinct Basque pig breed. It originated in Álava, but spread throughout the Basque Country and to other parts of Spain including Valencia, La Rioja and Castilla y Leon. In 1955 the breeding stock numbered some  animals; the breed became extinct in the 1960s.

Enkarterriko Asto

Euskal Antzara
The Euskal Antzara is the Basque breed of domestic goose. It is raised for both meat and eggs. Ganders weigh , geese about  less. The eggs are white and weigh at least .

Euskal Oiloa

The Euskal Oiloa is the chicken breed of the Basque Country. It has five varieties: Beltza (black), Gorria, Lepasoila (naked-necked), Marraduna and Zilarra. At the end of 2013 a population of  birds was reported, all from the País Vasco.

Euskal Txerria
The Euskal Txerria, also called Pie Noir du Pays Basque or Xuri eta beltza, is an indigenous breed of the Basque Country, standardized in France in 1921, and today endangered.

Jaca Navarra

Latxa

The Latxa, also encountered as lacha in the Spanish spelling is a Basque dairy sheep. They are mostly bred in Biscay, Gipuzkoa and Navarre for their milk which is used in the production of Idiazábal and Roncal cheeses.

A medium to small sheep with a fairly coarse wool.

Pottoka
The Pottoka is an ancient but endangered breed of mountain horse. They are small horses with a large head, small ears, short neck, long back, shaggy mane and small hooves. Originally these roamed the Basque Pyrenees in a semi-feral state but today many are stabled.

Basque dogs

There are five Basque dog breeds: 
 the Basque Shepherd Dog (pastor vasco in Spanish) is common throughout the Basque Country.
 the 
 the Pachón de Vitoria or Pachón Navarro
 the Villano de Las Encartaciones or 
 the Villanuco de Las Encartaciones or 
Of these, all but the Pachón de Vitoria are indigenous to the Basque Autonomous Community, and were recognised as traditional Basque breeds by government decree in 2001.

Basque cultivars

Alubia pinta alavesa

The Alavan pinto bean is a type of common bean.

Basque apple cultivars

Apple growing has a long history in the Basque Country, in particular for use in making Basque cider. The earliest written records on cider making and drinking go back to the 11th and 12th century, the very first being a record of Sancho III of Navarre sending an envoy to the Monastery of Leire in 1014 who mentions apples and cider-making. The other is the circa 1134 diary of the pilgrim Aymeric Picaud included in the Codex Calixtinus who mentions the Basques being notable for growing apples and drinking cider. The sixteenth-century inquisitor Pierre de Lancre also refers to the Basque Country as "the land of the apple". 

Many varieties exist and are used for making cider. Azkue's dictionary alone, which was printed in 1905, lists more than 80 Basque varieties of apples. Depending on the desired character of the finished cider, different varieties and proportions of apple varieties are used. Some common varieties include:

Errezila, sharp and sweet (mottled green), the most common Basque apple variety
Geza miña, sharp; also called sagar zuria and esnaola sagarra (green)
Goikoetxea, sharp (red)
Mokoa, sharp (red)
Mozoloa sweet and fresh (green)
Patzuloa, sweet and fresh (light green)
Txalaka sour and sweet (bright green)
Ugarte, sour (red)
Urdin sagarra, sharp (apple red on top and green underneath)
Urtebi txikia, sharp (yellow-green)

Espelette peppers

A variety of mild peppers with AOC certification, grown in the Northern Basque Country in the Espelette area.

Pelua cherries
Pelua cherries are an early Basque black cherry cultivar.

Xapata cherries
Xapata cherries are a variety of black cherry with a very short fruiting season, lasting only a few weeks around June. They are cultivates mainly in the area around the Lapurdian town of Itxassou.

Pyrenean breeds
Several breeds of animals are common both in the Basque Country and other regions straddling the Pyrenees.

Pirenaica

The Pirenaica is a breed of cattle found in the Basque Country, Aragon and Catalonia. There were more than  head in the Basque Autonomous Community in 1995, and the breed is not considered endangered.

Pyrenean Mountain Dog

The Pyrenean Mountain Dog (Pirinioetako mendiko zakurra in Basque) is a large breed of livestock guardian dog.

See also
Basque people
Cultivars
List of domesticated animals
Livestock in the Basque Country

References

Basque culture
Animal breeds originating in France
Animal breeds originating in Spain
Food plant cultivars